The Minister responsible for Prairies Economic Development Canada is the Minister of the Crown in the Canadian Cabinet who served as the chief executive of Western Economic Diversification Canada (WD). The post was traditionally held by an MP from Western Canada, although occasionally the responsibilities were accorded to a more senior cabinet minister, such as the Industry minister.

As of November 4, 2015, WD, along with Canada's other regional development agencies, is operated as part of the Innovation, Science and Economic Development (ISED) portfolio, led by Minister Navdeep Bains.

Related regional development posts include Minister for the Atlantic Canada Opportunities Agency and Minister of the Economic Development Agency of Canada for the Regions of Quebec, positions which have also been folded into ISED under Minister Bains.

On August 5, 2021, the Government of Canada announced that Western Economic Diversification would be divided into two new agencies—PacifiCan for BC; and PrairiesCan for Alberta, Manitoba, and Saskatchewan.

Ministers
Key:

References

Western Economic Diversification